Mehmet Yılmaz (born 22 May 1979) is a Turkish retired footballer.

Club career
Yılmaz previously played for Gaziantepspor, B.B. Ankaraspor, Trabzonspor and Denizlispor, where he spent the second half of the 2005–2006 season on loan.

On 3 September 2012, he joined Akhisar Belediyespor on a two-year contract.

Honours
Trabzonspor
 Turkish Cup: 2002–03, 2003–04

References

External links

 Guardian Stats Centre

1979 births
Living people
Turkish footballers
Association football forwards
Turkey international footballers
Turkey B international footballers
Turkey under-21 international footballers
Dardanelspor footballers
Altay S.K. footballers
Samsunspor footballers
Trabzonspor footballers
Denizlispor footballers
Ankaraspor footballers
MKE Ankaragücü footballers
Eskişehirspor footballers
Gaziantepspor footballers
Antalyaspor footballers
People from Of, Turkey